Phyllobacterium leguminum is a Gram-negative bacteria from the genus of Phyllobacterium which was isolated from root nodules from the plants Argyrolobium uniflorum and Astragalus algerianus.

References

Phyllobacteriaceae
Bacteria described in 2006